Tateyama may refer to:

People with the surname
 Midori Tateyama, Japanese writer
 Shohei Tateyama (born 1981), Japanese baseball player
 Yoshinori Tateyama (born 1975), Japanese baseball player
 Homarefuji Yoshiyuki (born 1985), Japanese sumo wrestler now known as Tateyama Oyakata

Places
 Mount Tate (立山), a mountain range in Toyama Prefecture, Japan
 Tateyama, Toyama (立山町), a town in Toyama Prefecture, Japan
 Tateyama, Chiba (館山市), a city in Chiba Prefecture, Japan
 Tateyama Domain, a feudal domain under the Tokugawa shogunate, in present-day Chiba Prefecture

Japanese-language surnames